Karachaganak Field is a gas condensate field about  east of Aksay (Ақсай) in northwest Kazakhstan. It was once a massive Permian and Carboniferous reef complex covering an area . It is estimated to contain  of gas and one billion tonnes of liquid condensate and crude oil. Discovered in 1979, it began production under Karachaganakgazprom, a subsidiary of Gazprom. In 1992, AGIP (now Eni) and British Gas were awarded sole negotiating rights, forming a partnership company. In 1997, Texaco (now Chevron Corporation) and Lukoil signed a 40-year production sharing agreement with the original two companies and the Kazakhstan government to develop the field for world markets. The agreement was turned under a partnership company known as Karachaganak Petroleum Operating (KPO) where Royal Dutch Shell and ENI are joint operators with a 29.25% stake each in the company, and with Chevron and Lukoil owning 18% and 13.5% respectively. In September 2009
the KPO filed an arbitration case against Kazakhstan.
The Republic of Kazakhstan appointed Maksat Idenov  to lead the negotiations,
after which the arbitration was suspended towards an amicable settlement of the dispute 
and KazMunayGas engaged in entrance into the project in 2010.
Under the terms of an agreement reached on December 14, 2011, the Republic of Kazakhstan has acquired through KazMunayGas a 10% stake for $2 billion cash and $1 billion non-cash consideration.

History
Located in the Uralsk Region of West Kazakhstan, it was discovered in 1979 by a well drilled to investigate a structural high detected during a reinterpretation of 2D seismic shot between 1970 and 1971. Production began in 1984 under the operatorship of Karachaganakgazprom. Limited quantities of gas and condensate were exported to Russia via pipelines and to the processing facilities at Orenburg. On 3 October 2006, Kazakhstan and Russia signed an agreement to create a joint venture on the basis of Orenburg gas processing plant for processing gas from the Karachaganak field.

Phase 1
The phase began with three wells penetrating into the Permian formations of the reservoir. Once produced to surface the gas and oil were separated before being piped to Orenburg where further processing was undertaken. This was partially due to the sour nature of the gas, with a hydrogen sulphide content of 3.5-5.0% and carbon dioxide content of 5%. Karachaganckgazprom also maintained a policy of full gas voidage replacement to maintain pressure of the reservoir above the dew point.

Phase 2
Beginning in 2000 under the operatorship of Karachaganak Petroleum Operating (KPO), the field went under a redevelopment program. This involved an investment of over US$1 billion into the construction and enhancement of existing facilities, new gas and liquid processing and gas injection facilities, a workover program consisting of 100 existing wells, a 120 MW power station for the facilities, and connection to the Caspian Pipeline Consortium via a  line to Atyrau.

Reservoir properties

Production
In January - June 2005,  of gas was recovered, and 5.7 million tons of liquid hydrocarbons was produced.

Overall, it is planned to recover about 300 million tons of liquid hydrocarbons and  natural gas during the contract period.

One current production issue facing the field is the increasing amount of gas of which a large amount is sour. As the export facilities of the project are not fully developed, most of this gas is being recycled back into the reservoir until it can be exported profitably.

Field reserves

Geology
The Karachaganak Field is one of the world's largest gas condensate fields. It is located in the Pre-Caspian (or North Caspian) Basin, which extends from the southeastern margin of the Russian Platform down to the northern coast of the Caspian Sea, and includes the offshore Caspian Sea north of about 44° N. The North Caspian is a pericratonic depression of Late Proterozoic-Early Paleozoic age. The basin is subdivided into numerous zones by large salt domes, and the primary salt layer, the Permian Kungurian salt, separates strata vertically into subsalt and suprasalt layers. The basin is bounded to the east by the Hercynian Ural Mountains and to the southeast and south by other orogenic belts. In the north, the basin lies on the flank of the Voronezh Massif in the west and the Volga-Ural Platform in the north. Numerous oil and gas fields have been discovered in this region in addition to Karachaganak, such as Astrakhan, Tengiz and Zhanazhol Fields.

The field consists of a heterogeneous carbonate massif with strata from three geologic periods and numerous stages of deposition during these periods. The following have been identified:

Permian: Kungurian, Artinskian, Sakmarian, Asselian
Carboniferous: Serpukhovian, Visean, Tournaisian
Devonian: Famennian

The depositional setting of the field is also varied. On the basis of core sample analysis and seismic studies the following depositional settings have been identified: limestone, talus, normal marine, shallow marine, inner reef lagoon, reef core, relatively deep water, slope, and anhydrite.

The variation of deposition is due to the long period over which the Karachaganak structure was formed. From the Late Devonian to the middle Carboniferous the field was an atoll, over which in the Early Permian a system of reefs were built. At its greatest the reservoir is 1.5 km thick. This type of reservoir structure has been seen in analogous fields including Kenkiyak, Zhanazhol, Tengiz, and possibly Astrakhan fields. A west-east cross section through Karachaganak resembles the twin humps of a camel, indicating two separate reef highs.

Likewise, the large variation of deposition has led to four different types of carbonate cores in the structure: biothermal, biomorphic detrital, organo-clastic, and biochemogenic. Of these biomorphic detrital are the most common followed by biothermal rock types. However, estimates of their volumes range from 30-90% for the former and 10-60% for the latter.

Oil and gas migration 
As with other reservoirs in the North Caspian (Pricaspian) Basin, it is thought that the Karachaganak reservoir was filled over multiple stages, the first of which began during late Paleozoic time with the formation of oil pools. As the basin began to subside, gas was generated and migrated to the traps. The gassiness of the reservoirs is determined by their location in the basin. Northern reservoirs tend to be wet; the southwest part of the basin is more gas prone than are the east and southeast.

Berezovka controversy 
Since 2002, residents from the village located closest to the Karachaganak Field have been campaigning for relocation and compensation. The villagers, led by the local organization Zhasil Dala (Green Steppe), maintain that they are suffering a host of illnesses and environmental degradation due to exposure to toxic emissions from the Karachaganak Field, situated five kilometers away.

Independent Bucket Brigade air monitoring conducted by the villagers from September 2004 to August 2005 registered more than 25 toxic substances in the air, including hydrogen sulfide, methylene chloride, carbon disulfide, toluene, and acrylonitrile.  In 2005, Karachaganak's regional environmental authority temporarily revoked the operating license of KPO B.V. due to environmental violations, including emitting 56 thousand tons of toxic waste in the atmosphere in 2004, improper storage of toxic solid waste on the field, and dumping toxic effluent into the water table.  The consortium was found to have dumped an excess of waste in 2008, resulting in a $21 million fine in early 2010.

The villagers contend that they should have been relocated upon the start of field operations as Kazakhstani law stipulates a five-kilometer Sanitary Protection Zone (SPZ) around the field.  However, in 2003, the government reduced the SPZ to three kilometers, effectively barring the villagers from relocation. After three years of protest from the villagers, Kazakhstan's Public Prosecutor found the 2003 decision to reduce the SPZ to be illegal, and the five-kilometer SPZ was reinstated in 2006.
However, the village has not been relocated.

In 2002, the private sector arm of the World Bank Group, the International Finance Corporation (IFC), provided $150 million in loans to Lukoil for development of the Karachaganak Field.  These loans were repaid by Lukoil in January 2009.
From 2004 to 2008, three complaints were filed with the IFC's Compliance Advisor/Ombudsman's office regarding the IFC's violations of its own environmental standards in financing the Karachaganak Field.
One of the complaints results in a report by the Auditor, published in April 2008, which documented numerous instances of non-compliance with IFC standards at Karachaganak.  One of the revelations was that no results for hydrogen sulfide monitoring had been reported between 2003 and 2006—years during which the Berezovka residents maintain they were suffering health problems due to hydrogen sulfide exposure.

Zhasil Dala works in partnership on this campaign with the US-based environmental justice organization Crude Accountability and the Kazakhstani Ecological Society Green Salvation, among others.

See also

 Natural gas processing
 Natural gas condensate
 Oil and gas basins of Kazakhstan

References
 Kazakhstan's Gas: Export Markets and Export Routes, by Shamil Yenikeyeff, Oxford Institute for Energy Studies, November 2008

External links
Karachaganak Petroleum Operating Homepage
BG Group - Kazakhstan
ENI - Kazakhstan
Chevron - Eurasia
Lukoil - International Exploration
Caspian Pipeline Consortium
Crude Accountability
Green Salvation
  Karachaganak and the Future of Petrochemical Industry in Kazakhstan

Oil fields of Kazakhstan
Natural gas fields in Kazakhstan
Oil fields of the Soviet Union
Chevron Corporation oil and gas fields
Lukoil oil and gas fields
Natural gas fields in the Soviet Union
Environmental justice